Otiorhynchus raucus is a species of broad-nosed weevil in the beetle family Curculionidae. It is found in North America.

References

Further reading

External links

 

Entiminae
Articles created by Qbugbot
Beetles described in 1776
Taxa named by Johan Christian Fabricius